Tere Bin (English: Without You) is an Indian Hindi-language drama television series, which premiered 18 July 2016 on &TV at 8pm and ended its run on 25 November 2016. The series was produced by Shree Sidhivinayak Chitra. Gaurav Khanna, Shefali Sharma and Khushboo Tawde played lead roles in the series.

Plot
The show is about Dr. Akshay Sinha (Gaurav Khanna) who sacrificed his love to help his friend's fiance, Vijaya (Shefali Sharma) because she was pregnant when his friend was dead. Akshay and Vijaya have been married for years but their marriage is a formal one where they care for each other and live as a family but don't have the relationship of a husband and wife.

Eight years later, his love, Nandini (Khushboo Tawde) returns. He has a hard time explaining to her what happened and why he had to leave her.while Vijaya accepted her marriage and akshay and she also want a life as a normal husband and wife unaware of the fact that akshay and nandini having an affair.Meanwhile, the stress of the situation and keeping it from Vijaya causes him to behave strangely making Vijaya concerned. Akshay first wanted to end his and vijaya's marriage by that he can be with nandini. But whenever he tried to reveal his relationship with nandini he stopped by himself doing that.

Vijaya finally finds the truth of akshay and nandini but she challenges nandini that she will balance their marriage in one month otherwise she will go from akshay's life forever.Nandini tries to woo Akshay back into her life and away from Vijaya much to the dismay of her friend Irfaan who has been trying to convince her to move on.

Evantually Akshay started to realise his priorities and his feelings for Vijaya and he confessed his past relationship with nandini to Vijaya who told him that she knew the matter some days ago. Then couple confess their love and consummate the marriage. While nandini realised the fact that now akshay does not love her and she has to move on. She decides to marry irfan who already loves and care nandini.

The show ends with Akshay, Vijaya, Irfan and Nandini starting their life afresh...

Cast
Gaurav Khanna as Dr. Akshay Sinha
Shefali Sharma as Vijaya Akshay Sinha
Khushboo Tawde as Nandini Bhatt
Rohit Bhardwaj as Irfaan
Mahi Milan Kanani as Neeti Sinha

References

2016 Indian television series debuts
Hindi-language television shows
Indian drama television series
Television shows set in Mumbai
&TV original programming
2016 Indian television series endings